Lamb, sometimes called Lamb Island or The Lamb, is a small uninhabited island measuring approximately , between the islands of Fidra and Craigleith in the Firth of Forth, off the east coast of Scotland. 
The Lamb is flanked by two "sheep dogs", North and South Dog Islands, which are basically small skerries. Like the other Islands of the Forth off North Berwick, the Lamb is a result of volcanic activity millions of years ago.

Access 
The Lamb can be reached by canoes and small boats from North Berwick, although there are no landing facilities and little to attract visitors when compared to Fidra island or the Bass Rock.

Wildlife
Following a two-year operation involving 35 visits with canoes and infra-red cameras, a single invasive rat was removed from the island in 2022.

Ownership
Lamb island was historically part of the Scottish feudal barony of Direlton.
The Lamb, along with North and South Dog Islands, was previously owned by Camilo Agasim-Pereira, Baron of Dirleton and Fulwood.

In 2009 the islands were sold for £30,000 to Uri Geller, who states that he believes that it is a hiding place for ancient Egyptian treasure, In mid-2022 Geller sought to declare Lamb as Republic of Lamb, a micronation with its own national anthem. Geller also became chairman of the North Berwick Amateurs FC, designated as Lamb's national football team.

Footnotes

External links 

Illustrated report of a visit to the island
Report of overnight stay on the island

Islands of the Forth
Landforms of East Lothian
Uninhabited islands of Scotland
North Berwick
Micronations in Scotland